Giacalone is a surname. Notable people with the surname include:

 Anthony Giacalone (1919–2001), organized crime figure
 Giuseppe Giacalone (second half of the 16th century), Italian architect
 Paul Giacalone (1939–2013), singer and drummer of American group The Fireflies
 Vito Giacalone (1923–2012), organized crime figure

Italian-language surnames